Lady Gaga is an American singer, songwriter and actress who has received many awards and nominations. She made her debut with the album The Fame (2008), which was nominated for six Grammy Awards, and won Best Electronic/Dance Album and Best Dance Recording for "Poker Face". It also won a Brit Award for International Album. The follow-up EP, The Fame Monster (2009), included the singles "Bad Romance" and "Telephone", whose music videos won eight of their thirteen nominations at the 2010 MTV Video Music Awards (VMA)—making Gaga the most-nominated artist in VMA history for a single year and the first person ever to win the Video of the Year and earn multiple nominations in the same category in one single night. In 2011, Gaga was nominated for six Grammy Awards, and won three—Best Pop Vocal Album for The Fame Monster, and Best Female Pop Vocal Performance and Best Short Form Music Video for "Bad Romance". Born This Way (2011), Gaga's second studio album, accrued three Grammy nominations, including her third consecutive nomination for Album of the Year. The music video for the track "Born This Way" won two VMAs, including Best Female Video. Her third album, Artpop (2013), was nominated for a Billboard Music Award for Top Dance/Electronic Album. In other musical ventures, Gaga released two collaborative jazz albums with Tony Bennett, Cheek to Cheek (2014) and Love for Sale (2021), which both received the Grammy Award for Best Traditional Pop Vocal Album.

In 2015, Gaga released a song for the documentary film, The Hunting Ground, called "Til It Happens to You". It won a Satellite Award for Best Original Song, and was nominated for an Academy Award for Best Original Song and a Grammy Award for Best Song Written for Visual Media. That year, she became the first artist to win the Songwriters Hall of Fame's Contemporary Icon Award for "attaining an iconic status in pop culture". Gaga received a Golden Globe Award for Best Actress and a nomination at the 20th Satellite Awards for her role in the fifth season of American Horror Story, entitled Hotel. She has received four nominations at the Primetime Emmy Awards for her television specials.

In 2018, Gaga starred as a singer in the musical romance A Star Is Born, which garnered her the Critics' Choice Movie Award for Best Actress and the National Board of Review Award for Best Actress, as well as nominations for an Academy Award, a Golden Globe Award, a Screen Actors Guild Award and a BAFTA Award for Best Actress. The same film's soundtrack earned her the BAFTA Award for Best Film Music and Grammy Award for Best Compilation Soundtrack for Visual Media. For its lead single "Shallow" (featuring Bradley Cooper), Gaga received an Academy Award, a Golden Globe Award for Best Original Song, a Critics' Choice Movie Award for Best Song and Grammy Awards for Best Pop Duo/Group Performance and Best Song Written for Visual Media, an award she also won the following year for "I'll Never Love Again". As a result, Gaga became the first woman in history to win an Academy Award, Grammy Award, BAFTA Award and Golden Globe Award in one single year. 

In 2020, Gaga's sixth album, Chromatica, yielded the single "Rain on Me", for which she won her second Grammy Award for Best Pop Duo/Group Performance — becoming the first all-female collaboration in history to win it. In the same year, at the MTV Video Music Awards, she was honored with the inaugural Tricon Award recognizing artists accomplished in different areas of the entertainment industry, and won four more awards, making her the third biggest winner in VMAs' history, with eighteen awards. In 2022, Gaga released the song "Hold My Hand", for the film, Top Gun: Maverick, earning her third Satellite Award for Best Original Song and nominations at major awards shows, with her third one for the Academy Award for Best Original Song.

In addition to music awards, Gaga has earned several accolades for her philanthropic efforts, fourteen Guinness World Records, and received a National Arts Awards' Young Artist Award, which honors individuals who have shown accomplishments and leadership early in their career. She also won the Fashion Icon award by the Council of Fashion Designers of America (CFDA) in 2011 and the Jane Ortner Artist Award from the Grammy Museum in 2016. Recognized by Billboard as the Greatest Pop Star in 2009, with honorable mention in 2010 and 2011, and Woman of the Year in 2015, she has also been included in several Forbes power rankings, was ranked fourth on VH1's Greatest Women in Music (2012), and was named by Time as one of the 100 most influential people in the world in 2010 and 2019.

Awards and nominations

Other accolades

World records

Listicles

State honors

Notes

References

Book sources 

 
 
 
 
 

Awards
Lady Gaga